North Carolina Highway 86 (NC 86) is a primary state highway in the U.S. state of North Carolina that runs north and south through Orange and Caswell Counties from Chapel Hill to the Virginia state line at Danville, Virginia. The highway primarily links the towns of Chapel Hill, Hillsborough, and Yanceyville, along with providing a route between Chapel Hill and Virginia. Between Chapel Hill and Hillsborough, NC 86 parallels and serves as an alternative to I-40.

Route description

From NC 86's southern terminus at US 15/US 501/NC 54 Bypass (Fordham Boulevard) in Chapel Hill, the highway passes through the town's center and the campus of the University of North Carolina at Chapel Hill. Exiting Chapel Hill, the highway intersects I-40 before crossing into rural Orange County. As NC 86 reaches Hillsborough, it meets I-85 and then passes through Hillsborough's downtown. Further north, 86 meets the southern terminus of NC 57. NC 86 briefly joins NC 49 as they cross the Caswell County line.

Entering the small community of Prospect Hill, NC 86 splits from NC 49 and travels north toward Yanceyville. Just outside Yanceyville, NC 86 joins US 158 and crosses NC 62. After passing through central Yanceyville, US 158 splits west while NC 86 continues north to the state line, where the route continues as State Route 86 and travels into Danville, Virginia.

History
Prior to 1940, this was numbered as NC 14. It was renumbered to match up with Virginia's Route 86. Simultaneous with that change, the old NC 65 was renumbered as NC 14.

Old North Carolina Highway 86, (sometimes referred to as Old 86), is a highway that parallels NC 86. Heading from NC 54 near Carrboro, it follows northwest to Homestead/Dairyland Road near the unincorporated community of Calvander, it heads north paralleling I-40 until the intersection at exit 261. Then intersecting I-85, at exit 164, it ends at the intersection with US 70 Business, and NC 86. The highway was moved to the more heavily traveled corridor between Chapel Hill and Hillsborough in the 1950s.

Major intersections

Special routes

Hillsborough truck route

North Carolina Highway 86 Truck (NC 86 Truck) is a bypass route for truck drivers that are traveling through the city of Hillsborough. This  route goes west around the entire city, via I-85 (between exits 165 and 160), I-85 Connector and US 70. The routing is well marked throughout and there are warning signs for truck drivers, including "tolerance ends," for that continue through the city.

References

External links

 NCRoads.com: N.C. 86

086
Transportation in Orange County, North Carolina
Transportation in Caswell County, North Carolina